Dudleya viscida is a rare succulent plant known by common name as the sticky liveforever, sticky dudleya or the San Juan stylophyllum. It is endemic to California, where it is found on rocky slopes. It is unique among the genus Dudleya in that it has sticky, fragrant leaves, a trait only shared with Dudleya anomala.

Description

Morphology 
Dudleya viscida has a basal clump of erect fleshy, pointed leaves which are nearly cylindrical or most often elliptical in cross section. They are pale green to yellow-green or red in color and covered in a sticky, oily exudate which has a faintly resinous scent. It grows erect stems with many-branched inflorescences, with each branch bearing up to 10 flowers. Each flower is pink to nearly white with red veining or streaks and protruding stamens between the pointed petals.

Flower is from May to June. Chromosome number is n=17.

Taxonomy

Taxonomic history 
This plant was described from the types collected on rocks near the San Juan Capistrano Hot Springs, by a Rev. J. C. Nevin in October 1881. The collection was deposited at the Gray Herbarium of Harvard University. Joseph Nelson Rose's specimens were labeled as "Ocean Beach, near San Diego," but this is likely an error, probably referring to Oceanside instead. Reid Moran placed the species in Dudleya, as Stylophyllum was recognized as a subgenera.

Distribution
This Dudleya is endemic to southern California, where it is known from only about 20 occurrences in San Diego, Orange, and Riverside Counties. It is mainly found on coastal sage scrub bluffs and inland chaparral rocky slopes, usually below 450 meters. In San Diego County, it is found on the bluffs at the mouth of the Santa Margarita River, Escondido Creek at Olivenhain, and San Marcos Creek.

Conservation 
This species was once a candidate for the recognition under the Endangered Species Act, but a federal review in 1996 determined that the population was stable and larger than previously though. The plant's population roughly numbers between 100,000 and 250,000 individuals.

References

External links
Jepson Manual Treatment - Dudleya viscida
USDA Plants Profile
Dudleya viscida - Photo gallery

viscida
Endemic flora of California
Natural history of the California chaparral and woodlands
Natural history of Orange County, California
Natural history of Riverside County, California
Natural history of San Diego County, California
Taxa named by Reid Venable Moran
Taxa named by Joseph Nelson Rose